A14 may refer to:
 Aero A.14, a Czech reconnaissance aircraft built after World War I
 Anatomical Therapeutic Chemical (ATC) Classification System 14 (ATC code A14) Anabolic agents for systemic use, a subgroup of the ATC Classification System
 Apple A14 Bionic processor, designed by Apple and used in the iPad Air (2020), iPhone 12 and iPhone 12 Pro.
 British NVC community A14 (Myriophyllum alterniflorum community), a British Isles plant community
 Curtiss XA-14 Shrike, a 1930s-era ground-attack airplane
 English Opening, Encyclopaedia of Chess Openings code
 Fiat A.14, a 1917 Italian 12-cylinder, liquid-cooled, V aero engine
 , a 1989 hydrographic ship of the Royal New Zealand Navy
 , an alternate name for HMS B1, a submarine of the British Royal Navy
 Nissan A14, a 1975–2008 car engine
 Samsung Galaxy A14, an Android smartphone series by Samsung Electronics.

See also
 List of A14 roads
 Subfamily A14, a rhodopsin-like receptors subfamily